Cow Creek is a  stream that flows through Rice and Reno Counties, Kansas. Cow Creek is a tributary of the Arkansas River; its confluence with the Arkansas is about ten miles southeast of Hutchinson, Kansas.

In the 1850s, Buffalo Bill Mathewson ran a trading post (known as "Buffalo Bill's Well") where the Santa Fe Trail crossed Cow Creek. From Lyons, Kansas, the well is located four miles west and one mile south.

See also
List of rivers of Kansas

External links and references

 ""
 Historical marker cow creek station
 "Santa Fe Trail Research". View From USGS Aerial Photographs.
  Louise Barry, The Ranch at Cow Creek Crossing (Beach Valley, P. O.)
 Alternate site
  Donald O. Whittemore, TMDL Salt Assessment and Analysis: Chloride Impairment in the Gar-Peace and Cow Subbasins of the Lower Arkansas River Basin. Cow Creek Subbasin

Rivers of Rice County, Kansas
Rivers of Reno County, Kansas
Rivers of Kansas
Tributaries of the Arkansas River